Dicoma pretoriensis is a species of flowering plant in the family Asteraceae.
It is found only in South Africa.
Its natural habitat is subtropical or tropical dry shrubland.
It is threatened by habitat loss.

References

Dicoma
Flora of South Africa
Critically endangered plants
Taxonomy articles created by Polbot